Sigurbjörg Þrastardóttir (born August 27, 1973) is an Icelandic writer.

She was born in Akranes and received a BA in comparative literature and a degree in journalism and mass communications from the University of Iceland. She subsequently worked for the newspaper Morgunblaðið for a number of years, including writing a column for Lesbók, a weekly cultural supplement.

In 1999, she published her first book Blálogaland ("Land of Blue Flames"), a collection of poetry. In 2002, she published a novel Sólar saga ("The Story of Sól"); it received the Tómas Guðmundsson Literature Award. In 2012, she published a second novel Stekk ("Jump"). Her poetry has been translated into twelve languages. Part of her play Seven Women Murdered at a Sauna was read at the Reykjavik City Theatre as part of the Reykjavik Arts Festival.

Her poetry collection Hnattflug ("Circumnavigation") was named best book of poetry in 2000 by the staff of Icelandic book stores. In 2008, Her poetry book Blysfarir ("Torching") was given the Fjöruverðlaunin women´s literature award and, in 2009, was nominated for the Nordic Council's Literature Prize. In 2010, the poetry collection Brúður ("Bride") was nominated for the DV cultural award. In January and February 2003, she was named official poet of the Reykjavík City Library.

References

External links 
 

1973 births
Living people
Sigurbjorg Thrastardottir
Sigurbjorg Thrastardottir
Sigurbjorg Thrastardottir
Sigurbjorg Thrastardottir
Sigurbjorg Thrastardottir
21st-century Icelandic women writers